"Solovey" is a song by Ukrainian electro-folk band Go_A. It was set to represent Ukraine in the Eurovision Song Contest 2020 in Rotterdam before the contest was cancelled due to the COVID-19 pandemic. It would have been the first song sung entirely in Ukrainian to represent the country at Eurovision.

Eurovision Song Contest

The song was selected to represent Ukraine in the Eurovision Song Contest 2020, after Go_A was chosen through Vidbir, the music competition that selects Ukraine's entries for the Eurovision Song Contest. On 28 January 2020, a special allocation draw was held which placed each country into one of the two semi-finals, as well as which half of the show they would perform in. Ukraine was placed into the first semi-final, to be held on 12 May 2020, and was scheduled to perform in the second half of the show.

It was announced on March 18 2020 that, due to the 2020 pandemic of Coronavirus, the Eurovision Song Contest for 2020 would not go ahead. Tentatively, the national broadcasters have stated that no further national selection will take place in Ukraine next year and Go_A will be allowed to return as the Ukrainian entry for Eurovision 2021. According to the rules of the competition, Go_A would have to create a new song for the 2021 competition, which they did with "Shum."

Charts

Release history

References

2020 singles
2020 songs
Ukrainian-language songs
Eurovision songs of 2020
Eurovision songs of Ukraine
Go A songs
Folktronica songs
Articles with underscores in the title